The 2013 Canadian Championship (officially the Amway Canadian Championship for sponsorship reasons) was a soccer tournament hosted and organized by the Canadian Soccer Association that took place in the cities of Edmonton, Montreal, Toronto and Vancouver in 2013. As in the previous tournament, participating teams included FC Edmonton, Montreal Impact, Toronto FC and Vancouver Whitecaps FC. The Montreal Impact won the Voyageurs Cup and became Canada's entry into the Group Stage of the 2013–14 CONCACAF Champions League. It was the sixth edition of the annual Canadian Championship.

Teams

Matches

Bracket 

The teams were seeded based on 2012 league results. The three Major League Soccer teams were seeded No. 1, No. 2, and No. 3 based on their final regular season position during the 2012 Major League Soccer season, while the sole North American Soccer League team received the No. 4 seed.

 Each round is a two-game aggregate goal series with the away goals rule.

Semifinals 

Montreal Impact won 6−2 on aggregate.

Vancouver Whitecaps FC won 5−2 on aggregate.

Final 

2–2 on aggregate. Montreal won on away goals.

Top goalscorers

References 

2013
2013 in Canadian soccer
2013 domestic association football cups